Inga Johanne Balstad (born 25 January 1952 in Selbu) is a Norwegian politician for the Labour Party.  She served as a deputy representative in the Norwegian Parliament from Sør-Trøndelag county during the terms 1993–1997 and 1997–2001.

On the local level, Balstad was a member of Selbu municipal council from 1983 to 1991 and again since 2003, also serving as mayor since 2007. From 1991 to 1995, she was a member of the Sør-Trøndelag county council. She was also a member of the board of Sør-Trøndelag University College from 2001 to 2007.

References

1952 births
Living people
People from Selbu
Labour Party (Norway) politicians
Deputy members of the Storting
Mayors of places in Sør-Trøndelag
Women mayors of places in Norway
20th-century Norwegian women politicians
20th-century Norwegian politicians
Women members of the Storting